During the 2003–04 English football season, Swansea City A.F.C. competed in the Football League Third Division.

Season summary
After narrowly avoiding relegation from the Football League on the final day of the previous season, Swansea improved dramatically on last term's 21st-place finish by ending the campaign 10th in the table, albeit 12 points adrift of 9th-placed Oxford United. Their cup form improved too, beating Premiership hopefuls Preston North End in the fourth round of the FA Cup before being knocked out by Tranmere Rovers.

Striker Lee Trundle, signed from Welsh rivals Wrexham, finished 7th highest scorer (joint with Lincoln City's Gary Fletcher) in the division with 17 goals.

Squad

While on loan from Manchester United, Alan Tate wore the number 27 jersey.

Left club during season

2003-04
2003–04 Football League Third Division by team
Welsh football clubs 2003–04 season